Otis T. Delaporte (January 6, 1919 – April 1, 1981) was an American football and baseball player and coach. He served as the head football coach at Southwestern Oklahoma State University for 14 years from 1964 to 1977, compiling a 90–52–2 record and winning six conference titles. He also served as the school's athletic director until his death in 1981. Delaporte was married in 1939 to Francis Harryman.

During his career, Delaporte was inducted into the Southwestern Oklahoma State Hall of Fame (1982), the Oklahoma Coaches Association Hall of Fame (1974), the National Association of Intercollegiate Athletics Hall of Fame (1981), and the University of Central Oklahoma Athletics Hall of Fame in 1995.

Head coaching record

References

External links
 
 

1919 births
1981 deaths
American football ends
American men's basketball players
Baseball second basemen
Baseball third basemen
Central Oklahoma Bronchos baseball players
Central Oklahoma Bronchos football players
Central Oklahoma Bronchos men's basketball players
Fort Smith Giants players
Oklahoma City Indians players
Salina Millers players
Southwestern Oklahoma State Bulldogs athletic directors
Southwestern Oklahoma State Bulldogs football coaches